Chris Rathaus (also known as Chris Randall) (March 22, 1943 – May 18, 2006) was an American a radio producer, program director and talk show host of radio programs in the United States.  Rathaus passed on the Paul McCartney death hoax, to an associate radio dj, Roby Yonge at WABC in New York City

Early life and education
Chris Randall was born in Albany, New York on March 22, 1943

Career
Randall started his career at WPTR/Albany, New York.  Next he moved to WKNR-FM “Keener 13”/Detroit. From Detroit, Rathaus moved to Pittsburgh to become production director and assistant program director at Westinghouse’s KDKA Pittsburgh.

In 1974 he became program director of WOWO Fort Wayne, Indiana.  Later he moved to Tampa, Florida, where he directed programs at WDAE Tampa. As Chris Rathaus, he formed the audio production companies MediAide and Studio C in Tampa. During this time (late 1980's) he also worked as an adjunct professor at the University of South Florida (Main Tampa Campus) where he taught a class in audio production.  He was also the host of a nationally syndicated talk show, “The Rat House”.  It was syndicated on 100 stations through the Sun Radio Network in Clearwater, Florida.

Rathaus moved to Beasley Broadcasting's WQAM Miami, and Clear Channel’s WRMF-WJNO/West Palm Beach. He was also the producer of the Radio Ink audio program: “Radio Ink Live” series.

Becoming intrigued by new possibilities in changing technology, Rathaus left Palm Beach for the Internet radio start-up RadioCentral in San Francisco.  He was then hired at Sirius Satellite Radio, where he worked as a producer and helped expand their offerings to the unprecedented number they have achieved.

Death
Rathaus, at age 63, died of cancer in New York in 2006. Rathaus was best known for his audio production skills.

Legacy and honors
1998, he was awarded the International Radio TS Worldwide Gold Metal for best audio production.

References

2006 deaths
American radio personalities
American radio producers
Deaths from cancer in New York (state)
1943 births